Los de la Nazza are a Puerto Rican urban music duo formed in 2005 by Eliezer "Musicólogo" García and Eduardo "Menes" López. The duo achieved significant popularity in the Latin urban music field during the late 2000s and early 2010s as producers of Puerto Rican rapper Daddy Yankee, combining elements of reggaeton music with electronica influences. Musicólogo is Daddy Yankee's cousin.

The producers were joined as a duo by Daddy Yankee in 2007 and their first production credit was on his studio album El Cartel: The Big Boss, released later that year. Los de la Nazza continued working with Daddy Yankee until 2014, having produced songs including "Pose" (2008), "La Despedida" (2010), and "Lovumba" (2011).

Musicólogo and Menes began producing a series of mixtapes titled El Imperio Nazza released from 2012 to 2016. They turned independent in 2014, in order to focus on their own careers, and released their first studio album Orión in 2015.

History

Musicólogo, born Eliezer García on December 21, 1981 in Río Piedras, Puerto Rico, was raised in the Nemesio Canales Residential, where he first experienced the violence and rawness of the streets. His passion for music began during childhood due to his musician family. He graduated from the Gabriela Mistral Public School and ventured into university. Menes, born Eduardo López on August 29, 1980 in Caguas, Puerto Rico, was raised in Caguas until the age of 11, when he moved to Florida, United States with his family. He credits being the older brother of three sisters as what he needed to understand the "female language". Musicólogo and Menes first met at a recording studio in the Nemesio Canales Residential in 2005, Menes working with Puerto Rican producer Echo and Musicólogo having a solo career with his own recording studio.

In 2007, Musicólogo showed Puerto Rican rapper Daddy Yankee a demo of his work. He eventually decided to join them as a duo, subsequently signing Musicólogo & Menes to his record label El Cartel Records. Since then, Los de la Nazza produced one track on El Cartel: The Big Boss (2007) and were the main producers of Talento de Barrio (2008), Mundial (2010), Prestige (2012), and King Daddy (2013).

In January 2012, the duo released El Imperio Nazza, the first entry of a series of reggaeton mixtapes involving various artists or focused on one in particular, depending on the edition. These included Puerto Rican reggaeton acts Gotay, J Álvarez, Jowell & Randy, and Farruko. The last Imperio Nazza mixtape released under El Cartel Records was Top Secret Edition in January 2014.

In 2014, their contract with El Cartel expired and decided to start an independent career as a production duo. Their first studio album Orión was released digitally on August 11, 2015 under their own record label Nazza Records. The album peaked at number 8 on the US Latin Rhythm Albums chart on September 5, 2015. The single "Si El Mundo Se Acabara" featuring American singer Justin Quiles reached number one on the US Tropical Songs chart on April 30, 2016, being their first top spot placement on Billboard.

Production credits

Charted songs

Discography
Studio
Orión (2015)
Nazza 2020 (2020)

Mixtapes
El Imperio Nazza (2012)
El Imperio Nazza: Gold Edition (2012)
El Imperio Nazza: Gotay Edition (2012) – 
El Imperio Nazza: J Álvarez Edition (2012) – 
El Imperio Nazza: King Daddy Edition (2013) - 
El Imperio Nazza: Doxis Edition (2013) – 
El Imperio Nazza: Farruko Edition (2013) – 
El Imperio Nazza: Top Secret Edition (2014)
El Imperio Nazza: Justin Quiles Edition (2016) – 
El Imperio Nazza: Kendo Edition (2016) – 

EP's
Carnal Mixtape (2011) - 
Dunvo (2019) - 
Rain Rose (2020)
El Ultimo Tour Del Mundo (MYM REMAKE) (2020) - with Bad Bunny

Album Productions
El Cartel 3: The Big Boss (2007) - Daddy Yankee - 
Talento De Barrio: Soundtrack (2008) - Daddy Yankee - 
El Fenómeno (2008) - Arcángel - 
Mundial (2010) - Daddy Yankee - 
Los Verdaderos (2010) - Zion & Lennox - 
Mucha Calidad (2011) - Nova & Jory - 
Otro Nivel De Música (2011) - J Álvarez - 
El Concepto (2011) - Gotay - }
Otro Nivel De Musica (Reloaded) (2012) - J Alvarez - Tracks 7
The Most Powerful Rookie (2012) - Farruko - 
Tu Juguetito Sexual (2012) - Galante El Emperador - 
Prestige (2012) - Daddy Yankee - 
El Patan (2012) - Luigi 21 Plus - 
Reencarnal (2013) - Carnal - 
HD (2014) - Kent & Tony - 
Visionary (2015) - Farruko - Tracks 1-2
Now Or Never (2020) - Nio Garcia y Casper - Track 5

Musicologo (Solo Albums)
Canales Reggaeton (2002) 
Canales Malianteo (2002) 
Canales Reggaeton Vol. 2 (2003) 
Turbina (2003)
Los Dueños De Los Metales (2005)

Compilation
Los de la Nazza: The Collection, Vol. 1 (2013)
Los de la Nazza: The Collection, Vol. 2 (2014)
Los de la Nazza: The Collection, Vol. 3 (2017)

Awards and nominations
El Imperio Nazza: J Álvarez Edition – Lo Nuestro Award for Urban Album of the Year – Nominated (2014)

References

Puerto Rican musical groups